All in the Name of Love is the eighth studio album by R&B band Atlantic Starr released in March 1987 upon Warner Bros. Records. The album rose to nos. 4 & 18 on the Top R&B/Hip-Hop Albums and Billboard 200 charts. All in the Name of Love was also certified Platinum in the US by the RIAA.

Track listing 
 All songs written by David and Wayne Lewis, except where noted.

"One Lover at a Time" (Richard Feldman, Jimmy Scott) - 4:00
"You Belong with Me" - 4:53
"Females" - 3:42
"Don't Take Me for Granted" - 5:04
"Always" (Jonathan, David and Wayne Lewis) - 4:39
"Armed and Dangerous" (Garry Glenn, Martin Page, Maurice White) - 4:08 ++
"Let the Sun In" - 4:04
"Thankful" - 5:03
"I'm in Love" - 4:25 ++
"All in the Name of Love" (Sam Dees) - 5:26
"My Mistake" - 5:19
"Interlude" - 1:13

++ "Armed and Dangerous" and "I'm in Love" only appear on the CD versions of the album

Personnel 
Atlantic Starr
 David Lewis – guitars, programming, backing vocals, arrangements (1-5, 7-12), lead vocals (3, 5, 6, 7, 11, 12)
 Wayne Lewis – keyboards, programming, backing vocals, arrangements (1-5, 7-12), lead vocals (2, 3, 8, 10)
 Jonathan Lewis – keyboards, programming 
 Joseph Phillips – percussion
 Barbara Weathers – backing vocals, lead vocals (1, 4, 5, 9, 10)

Additional Musicians
 Rich Aronson – keyboard sweetening (1, 4, 10)
 Richard Feldman – rhythm keyboard programming (1), bass and drum programming (1)
 Rhett Lawrence – synthesizer programming (6)
 Fritz Cadet – guitar (2, 3)
 David Cochrane – guitar (2, 3, 4), bass (7)
 Andy Bloch – guitar (5, 8, 9)
 Charles Foster Johnson – guitar (6)
 Marlon McClain – guitar (6)
 Danny Atherton – drums (2, 8)
 Paulinho da Costa – percussion (1-4, 7-11)
 Gary Coleman – percussion (10, 11)
 Gerald Albright – saxophone solo (6, 7, 8)
 Duke Jones – flugelhorn solo (12)
 Maurice White – arrangements (6)
 Bill Myers – arrangements (6)
 Gene Page – horn and string arrangements, conductor

Production 
 David Lewis – producer (1-5, 7-12)
 Wayne Lewis – producer (1-5, 7-12)
 Jonathan Lewis – associate producer (1-5, 7-12)
 Maurice White – producer (6)
 Rory Young – engineer (1-5, 7-12)
 Peter Denenberg – additional engineer (1-5, 7-12)
 Bino Espinoza – additional engineer (1-5, 7-12), assistant engineer (1-5, 7-12)
 Fred Law – additional engineer (1-5, 7-12)
 Charles Holman Brown – assistant engineer (1-5, 7-12)
 Liz Cluse – assistant engineer (1-5, 7-12)
 Michael Dotson – assistant engineer (1-5, 7-12)
 Karen Siegel – assistant engineer (1-5, 7-12)
 Ralph Sutton – assistant engineer (1-5, 7-12)
 Tom Perry – engineer (6), mixing (6)
 Erik Zobler – mixing (1, 2, 3, 7, 12)
 Tommy Vicari – mixing (4, 5, 8, 10, 11)
 Ray Bardani – mixing (9)
 Brian Gardner – mastering 
 George DuBose – cover design, cover photography   
 Earl Cole, Jr. – management

Studios
 Mixed at Minot Sound Studios (White Plains, NY); Hollywood Sound Recorders and Soundcastle (Hollywood, CA).
 Mastered at Bernie Grundman Mastering (Hollywood, CA).

References 

Atlantic Starr albums
1987 albums
Albums arranged by Gene Page
Albums produced by Maurice White
Warner Records albums